Teacheramma is a 1968 Indian Tamil-language drama film directed by Puttanna Kanagal. The film stars Jaishankar, Muthuraman, C. R. Vijayakumari and Vanisri. It was remade in Malayalam as Premashilpi (1978).

Plot 

A school teacher sacrifices her love for the sake of her friend.

Cast 
 Jaishankar as Somu
 Muthuraman as Shankar
 Nagesh as Kalimann
 Vijayakumari as Sumathi
 Vanisri as Chandra
 S. N. Lakshmi as Shankar's mother

Production 
Teacheramma was directed by Puttanna Kanagal, produced by Subhalakshmi Pictures and written by Balamurugan.

Soundtrack 
The soundtrack was composed by T. R. Pappa, with lyrics by Kannadasan.

Release and reception 
Teacheramma was released on 12 April 1968. Kalki appreciated the director for making an entertaining film without resorting to compromises such as fight or dance sequences. In the 1970s, M. G. Ramachandran – then the Chief Minister of Tamil Nadu – personally appreciated Vijayakumari for her performance. The film was commercially successful.

References

External links 
 

1960s Tamil-language films
1968 drama films
1968 films
Films about educators
Films directed by Puttanna Kanagal
Films scored by T. R. Pappa
Indian drama films
Tamil films remade in other languages